Danel Sinani (born 5 April 1997) is a professional footballer who plays as a winger for EFL Championship club Wigan Athletic, on loan from Norwich City. Born in Belgrade to Gorani parents, he plays for the Luxembourg national team.

Club career

In Luxembourg
Sinani played club football in Luxembourg for Racing FC Union Luxembourg before joining F91 Dudelange in 2017. With the latter, he won two Luxembourg National Division titles and the Luxembourg Cup. In November 2018, he scored the first ever goal for a Luxembourgish club in the group stage of a major European competition against Olympiacos. In 2019, Sinani was given the Luxembourg Footballer of the Year award. It was his first award of the trophy, known as the Wanderpokal Challenge Guy Greffrath (Challenge Guy Greffrath Challenge Cup). In the summer of 2019, Sinani was offered a move to R.E. Virton, who play in the Belgian league, but he refused the deal. Later in the year, he scored two goals in a Europa League match against five time Europa League winners Sevilla. As of 2020, he has scored 13 goals in UEFA Champions League and Europa League matches. Sinani has scored 14 goals in 16 appearances in the 2019–20 Luxembourg National Division, nine goals in the 2019–20 UEFA Europa League, and 24 goals in 30 matches in all competitions.

Norwich City
In April 2020, he signed for Norwich City for the 2020–21 season. His contract is until 2023, and he is the first Luxembourgish Norwich City player.

In August 2020, Sinani was loaned to Belgian club Waasland-Beveren for the season.

On 28 July 2021, he joined Huddersfield Town on a season-long loan. As part of the loan agreement with Norwich, Huddersfield have the option to sign him permanently at the end of the season. Sinani made his EFL Championship debut as a late substitute in the 1–1 draw against Derby County at Pride Park on 6 August 2021. He made his full home debut against Everton in the EFL Cup on 24 August 2021 when Huddersfield lost 2–1.

Upon his return to Norwich he scored his first goal for the club in an EFL Cup win over Birmingham City on 9 August 2022. He then scored his first league goal for the club in his next appearance, a 2–1 victory over former club Huddersfield Town at Carrow Road.

On 31 January 2023, the last day of the 2022–23 winter transfer window, Sinani joined Championship side Wigan Athletic on loan until the end of the season.

International career
Sinani made his international debut for Luxembourg in 2017. Kosovo approached Sinani about representing them internationally, as his parents are from Dragash. Sinani refused the meeting to discuss it, as he sees Luxembourg as his home. Sinani scored three goals for Luxembourg during their 2018–19 UEFA Nations League D campaign.

Personal life
Sinani was born in Belgrade, Serbia, FR Yugoslavia to ethnic Gorani parents from Dragash. He moved to Luxembourg along with his family at the age of 5.

He is the younger brother of Dejvid Sinani.

Career statistics

Club

International

Scores and results list Luxembourg's goal tally first.

Honours
Dudelange
Luxembourg National Division: 2017–18, 2018–19
Luxembourg Cup: 2018–19

Individual
Luxembourgish Footballer of the Year: 2018–19

References

1997 births
Living people
Luxembourgian people of Serbian descent
Gorani people
Luxembourgian footballers
Footballers from Belgrade
Luxembourg international footballers
Association football wingers
Luxembourg Division of Honour players
Luxembourg National Division players
Belgian Pro League players
English Football League players
Racing FC Union Luxembourg players
F91 Dudelange players
Norwich City F.C. players
S.K. Beveren players
Huddersfield Town A.F.C. players
Wigan Athletic F.C. players
Luxembourgian expatriate footballers
Luxembourgian expatriate sportspeople in England
Expatriate footballers in England
Luxembourgian expatriate sportspeople in Belgium
Expatriate footballers in Belgium